The Upper Palatinate is one of the seven administrative districts of Bavaria, Germany, and is located in the east of Bavaria. It consists of seven districts and 226 municipalities (including three cities).

Geography 
The Upper Palatinate is a landscape with low mountains and numerous ponds and lakes in its lowland regions. By contrast with other regions of Germany it is more rural in character and more sparsely settled. It borders (clockwise from the north) on Upper Franconia, the Czech Republic, Lower Bavaria, Upper Bavaria and Middle Franconia.

Notable regions are:
 Stiftland, former estate and territorial lordship of Waldsassen Abbey with the market town of Konnersreuth, Fockenfeld Abbey, the town of Waldsassen and about 150 other villages.
 Upper Palatine Forest with deep valleys and many castles
 Upper Palatine Lake District with the Steinberger See
 Upper Palatine Jura, part of the Franconian Jura
 Steinwald including the Teichelberg and Pechbrunn
 Waldnaab/Wondreb Depression
 Bavarian Forest, together with the Bohemian Forest a large-scale protected area. A rock outcrop west of the summit cross of the Großer Arber is  1,439.6 m, the highest point in Upper Palatinate.
 Kunisch Mountains
 Naab valley
 Vils valley
 Danube valley, western part of the Gäuboden
 Lower Bavarian Hills south of the Danube

History 
At the beginning of the High Middle Ages the region now known as the Upper Palatinate was part of the Bavarian March of the Nordgau. The region took its current name no earlier than the early 14th century.

From the mid 13th century much of the region was controlled by the Wittelsbach dynasty and until 1329 was ruled by the Wittelsbach Elector Palatine as part of the larger County Palatine of the Rhine. By the 1329 Treaty of Pavia, the Wittelsbach territories were divided between two branches of the dynasty. The territory around the Rhine river in the west became known as the Rhenish Palatinate or Lower Palatinate, and is today usually known simply as the Palatinate; it is from this territory that the modern German state of Rhineland-Palatinate derives its name. By contrast, the territory to the east centred on Amberg became known as the Upper Palatinate, upper and lower in this case referring to the elevation of the territories (compare Low and High German, Upper and Lower Lusatia, Upper and Lower Lorraine, Low Countries, Lower Saxony).

Cadet branches of the Wittelsbach dynasty also ruled over smaller territories in Neuburg and Sulzbach. As a result of the Elector Palatine Frederick V's abortive claim to the Bohemian throne in 1619–1620, the Upper Palatinate, along with the rest of his lands, were declared forfeit to the Emperor and, along with the Electoral title, given to the Duke of Bavaria. Although the Lower Palatinate was restored to Frederick's son by the Peace of Westphalia in 1648, the Upper Palatinate remained under the Elector of Bavaria, and has remained a part of Bavaria ever since. The smaller territories of Sulzbach and Neuburg came to Bavaria in 1777 when Charles Theodore, Elector Palatine inherited the Bavarian lands of his Wittelsbach cousin Maximilian III Joseph, Elector of Bavaria. The city of Regensburg, an Imperial Free City, was not joined with the rest of the region until the end of the Holy Roman Empire in 1806 and the end of the short-lived Principality of Regensburg under Carl von Dalberg, which existed from 1803 to 1810.

After the founding of the Kingdom of Bavaria the state was totally reorganised and, in 1808, divided into 15 administrative districts (singular ), in Bavaria called  (literally "Circles",). They were created in the fashion of the French departments, quite even in size and population, and named after their main rivers. In 1837 king Ludwig I of Bavaria renamed the  after historical territorial names and tribes of the area. This also involved some border changes or territorial swaps. Thus the district name of Regenkreis changed to Upper Palatinate.

The development of railroads in the area is covered in the book .

Districts 

Landkreise (districts):
 Amberg-Sulzbach
 Cham
 Neumarkt
 Neustadt an der Waldnaab
 Regensburg
 Schwandorf
 Tirschenreuth

Kreisfreie Städte (district-free towns):
 Amberg
 Regensburg
 Weiden in der Oberpfalz

Population 
Historical Population of Upper Palatinate:
 1900:   553,841
 1910:   600,284
 1939:   694,742
 1950:   906,822
 1961:   898,580
 1970:   963,833
 1987:   969,868
 2002: 1,088,929
 2005: 1,089,543
 2006: 1,087,939
 2008: 1,085,216
 2010: 1,081,206
 2015: 1,092,339
 2019: 1,112,102

Economy 
The gross domestic product (GDP) of the region was €47.3 billion in 2018, accounting for 1.4% of German economic output. GDP per capita adjusted for purchasing power was €39,200 or 130% of the EU27 average in the same year. The GDP per employee was 103% of the EU average.

Main sights 
Major tourist attractions include the former ducal residences Regensburg with the Walhalla nearby and Amberg, the city of Weiden and Waldsassen Abbey including the Kappl Trinity church nearby.  Scenic attractions include the river Danube and the Upper Palatine Forest. A sight is also the town of Neumarkt and the pilgrim church of Maria Hilf in Freystadt nearby.

See also

 Lower Palatinate

References

External links
 Official website (German)
 Official website of government (German, English, Czech)
 wiki-en.genealogy.net

 
Government regions of Germany
NUTS 2 statistical regions of the European Union